Power Rangers in Space is a television series and the sixth season of the Power Rangers franchise, based on the 21st Super Sentai series Denji Sentai Megaranger.

In Space was a turning point for the Power Rangers franchise, as the season brought closure to six seasons of plot, and it ended the practice of having regular cast members act in consecutive seasons - which had been in existence since 1993. The theme of this series, and its successor, the Power Rangers Lost Galaxy, bears little similarity to their Sentai counterparts. The sixth series also marked the final regular appearances of Tracy Lynn Cruz, Patricia Ja Lee, Roger Velasco, and Selwyn Ward.

Plot
Picking up where Power Rangers Turbo left off, Dark Specter has captured Zordon and is beginning to drain his powers. An assortment of old and new villains praise his victory, but an unexpected figure uncovers his plan: the Red Space Ranger, Andros. Dark Specter orders the Princess of Evil, Astronema, to eliminate Andros so he can't jeopardize his plans.

Meanwhile, four of the former Turbo Rangers (T.J. Johnson, Carlos Vallerte, Ashley Hammond and Cassie Chan) and Alpha 6 are traveling in a NASADA space shuttle with the intent to save Zordon. They are pulled aboard the Astro Megaship and later encounter Andros. Though initially suspicious and dismissive of the four former Turbo Rangers, Andros realizes he'll need their help to save Zordon and gives them each an Astro Morpher. Additionally, modifications allow the NASADA space shuttle and the Astro Megaship to combine into the powerful Astro Megazord. The new Space Rangers team then returns to Earth for repairs and supplies, but are followed by Astronema.

The Space Rangers alternate between searching for Zordon and protecting Earth. From the Dark Fortress, Astronema seeks to eliminate them via Ecliptor (who raised her), Quantrons and a variety of monsters. Elgar has also been added to her team, but he remains a comedic bungler. Over time, allies (such as Phantom Ranger, Justin Stewart and Adam Park) offer the Rangers invaluable aid, with Zhane (the Silver Space Ranger) emerging from cryo-sleep and joining the team. New Zords are also introduced. Meanwhile, Bulk and Skull become assistants to wacky scientist Professor Phenomenus and join him in searching for aliens.

While dedicated to finding Zordon, Andros has another quest: finding his sister, Karone, who was kidnapped when they were children. Over time, Andros discovers his sister was kidnapped by Darkonda, the arch rival of Ecliptor who has multiple lives. Much to Andros' surprise, it turns out that Karone is Astronema, who was raised by Ecliptor to be evil. Andros is able to convince Astronema of the truth and she defects with Ecliptor's help. Unfortunately just as quickly, she and Ecliptor are both recaptured and reprogrammed to follow Dark Specter.

The reprogramming of Ecliptor worked excellent at first in returning him to being completely hostile to the Space Rangers, but the reprogramming also seemed to fade a tiny bit towards the end of the season. On the other hand, Astronema had become more evil than ever, as she not only wants to destroy the Space Rangers, but also Dark Specter. To that end, she unleashes the Psycho Rangers. The five robotic and borderline insane villains possess great power, which secretly comes from Dark Specter. Every time they fight, Dark Specter is drained of power and grows weaker. Individually, each Psycho Ranger is too powerful for their Space Ranger equivalents. But the Psycho Rangers are not as good with teamwork, and the six Space Rangers are able to overcome them with a great deal of effort and teamwork. Soon after, the Rangers suffer setbacks that see two Megazords destroyed, which are the Delta Megazord and The Mega Voyager.

Everything culminates in the two-part finale, "Countdown to Destruction", where Zordon is nearly completely drained and Dark Specter orders the villains under his command to attack the entire universe. Across the universe, the Alien, Gold Zeo and Phantom Rangers, the Blue Senturion, and KO-35's rebels are defeated and captured. The Space Rangers struggle to defend Earth, but are overwhelmed and forced to retreat. Even Zhane and his Zord, the Mega Winger, are no match, with the Mega Winger ending up destroyed. The treacherous Darkonda kills Dark Specter, who returns the favor before his own death, leaving Astronema in command as the Queen of Evil. While Andros boards the Dark Fortress to appeal to his sister, the remaining five Space Rangers engage in one last fight for Earth and are joined by the citizens of Angel Grove, with Bulk and Skull leading the charge.

On the Dark Fortress, Andros finds Zordon, who requests his energy tube be shattered. Doing so will release good energy that will destroy the forces of evil and save the universe, but also kill him. Following battles with Astronema and Ecliptor, Andros has no choice but to comply. The many monsters are subsequently turned to dust by the energy wave (including Ecliptor), while Lord Zedd, Rita Repulsa, Divatox and Astronema are changed into normal, non-evil humans. With the universe now safe, T.J., Cassie, Carlos, Ashley and Alpha 6 intend to settle down on Earth. Though initially intending to remain on KO-35 with their people, Andros, Zhane and Karone decide to join their friends on Earth.

Production
Early production material for the season, dated May and August 1997 when production was concurrently underway for the Fall 1997 episodes of Power Rangers Turbo, was placed online in June 2011. The first half includes synopses of the first twenty-seven episodes of Megaranger, with a mix of Japanese names and intended US names, and a breakdown of how much footage was "usable"; there is a list of weaponry and Zords introduced, how often they appear, and the monsters and how they are destroyed. It then goes on to set out initial plans for the in Space adaptation.

Both Astronema and Andros are absent, with the Phantom Ranger uncovering Dark Specter's plan instead, and Justin is identified as the Blue Ranger. Instead of losing their powers and base at the end of Turbo, the Rangers would be given their Space powers by Dimitria (the Turbo mentor) so they could head into space and save Zordon. Their spacecraft would have had a limited power supply and could only be recharged by the Power Chamber on Earth, forcing them to keep returning; otherwise, they would hop from planet to planet, encountering new and returning villains, and picking up clues for Zordon's whereabouts. Divatox was still going to be the main recurring villain, with Ecliptor as her new second-in-command. Bulk and Skull formed a volunteer Citizen Force Group to try and protect Angel Grove while the Rangers were away.

In Space would have seen Carranger villain Exhaus used as Dark Specter - he would instead be the monster Goldgoyle for the end of Turbo. The Rangers were going to have a base in Earth orbit called the new Power Dome: it was to be realized by "a giant pyramid made of silky material... the walls of silk will change constantly with special effects lights creating the different moods". The "Space Station" (Astro Megaship) interior was going to recycle as much of the Power Chamber set as possible; footage would be shot for the villain's "Evil Platform" set ahead of time and used as recurring stock footage.

This would be the last season to feature the character Skull (Jason Narvy) as Narvy himself chose to leave the Power Rangers universe to continue his college education.

Characters

Space Rangers
 Andros  The Red Space Ranger, and the leader of the team; a native of the planet KO-35 and leader of the Space Rangers. He uses his Ranger powers to defeat Astronema and try to recover his sister Karone. He also serves as Ashley's love interest. He piloted the Mega V1 Robo Zord and his primary weapon is the Spiral Saber. He is portrayed by Christopher Khayman Lee.
 Carlos Vallerte  The Black Space Ranger and previously the second Green Turbo Ranger. He piloted the Mega V2 Shuttle Zord and his primary weapon is the Lunar Lance. He is portrayed by Roger Velasco.
 Theodore Jay "T.J." Jarvis Johnson  The Blue Space Ranger. He was previously the second Red Turbo Ranger, and leader of the Turbo Rangers. He piloted the Mega V3 Rocket and his primary weapon is the Astro Axe. He is portrayed by Selwyn Ward.
 Ashley Hammond  The Yellow Space Ranger and previously the second Yellow Turbo Ranger. She serves as Andros' love interest. She pilots the Mega V4 Saucer Zord and her primary weapon is the Star Slinger. She is portrayed by Tracy Lynn Cruz.
 Cassie Chan  The Pink Space Ranger and previously the second Pink Turbo Ranger. She pilots the Mega V5 Tank Zord and her primary weapon is the Satellite Stunner. She is portrayed by Patricia Ja Lee.
 Zhane  The Silver Space Ranger; he is kept in a hidden room inside the Megaship, cryogenically asleep for two years because he was badly injured in his last battle while saving Andros from a monster. When he was accidentally released, he helped the Rangers, but is affected by a 2.5-minute morphing time limit which he is later able to remove by absorbing a bolt of lightning with his Morpher. He piloted the Mega Winger Zord and his primary weapon is the Super Silverizer. During the Psycho Ranger saga, in an effort to confuse the and throw off the Psycho Rangers, he temporarily faked being Psycho Silver. He is portrayed by Justin Nimmo.

Supporting characters
 Alpha 6  After his voice chip was damaged during the destruction of the Power Chamber, he received a new voice chip, but does not sound the same and has a different personality. Alpha no longer speaks like a New Yorker and now uses his predecessor's catchphrase. He is voiced by Wendee Lee (uncredited).
 D.E.C.A.  The on-board computer on the Megaship, D.E.C.A. responds to voice commands and is able to articulate in 3000 known languages. The ship is constantly monitored by her through cameras located in every room on the ship. She can also perform retinal scans. She is voiced by Julie Maddalena.
 Adelle Ferguson  Owner of the Surf Spot, the Rangers' new hangout; from observation, she appears to have bought Youth Center from Jerome Stone and converted it. She is portrayed by Aloma Wright.
 Farkas "Bulk" Bulkmeier  Returning once again from Turbo, he and Skull decide to seek out renowned alien expert Professor Phenomenus when they catch a glimpse of a UFO in the sky. He is portrayed by Paul Schrier.
 Eugene "Skull" Skullovitch  Bulk's best friend, and his opposite in appearance and mentality; Skull is thin and more stupid than Bulk, to the point that he has to be told what to be thinking of. Skull is best known for his high-pitched laughter. He is portrayed by Jason A. Narvy.
 Professor Phenomenus  A strange yet brilliant scientist who is constantly on the search for aliens on Earth. Bulk and Skull sought him out when they caught a glimpse of a UFO in the sky. The trio's misadventures and antics would often have them crossing paths with the Rangers. He is portrayed by Jack Banning.
 Teenage Mutant Ninja Turtles  The Turtles were summoned and brainwashed by Astronema to fight the Rangers. Her control over them is later broken, and they team up with the Rangers to battle Astronema's forces. Before returning to New York, the Turtles had one request: space surfing on the Galaxy Gliders. Due to Ninja Turtles: The Next Mutation being filmed in Vancouver, none of the Turtles' voice actors reprised their roles for their appearance.
 Leonardo  The leader of the Teenage Mutant Ninja Turtles. He is voiced by Michael Reisz.
 Raphael  The aggressive member of the Teenage Mutant Ninja Turtles. He is voiced by Derek Stephen Prince.
 Donatello  The scientific member of the Teenage Mutant Ninja Turtles. He is voiced by Ezra Weisz.
 Michelangelo  The fun-loving member of the Teenage Mutant Ninja Turtles. He is voiced by Tony Oliver.
 Venus de Milo  A female turtle who is the latest member of the group. She is voiced by Tifanie Christun.
 Alien Rangers  The Power Rangers from the water planet Aquitar. They have been allies to the Power Rangers of Earth, since Zordon called upon them when Master Vile reversed Earth's time. The Alien Rangers were later seen fighting Divatox's army.
 Justin Stewart  T.J., Cassie, Ashley, and Carlos' former teammate. After the destruction of the Power Chamber and the loss of the Turbo powers, Justin elected to remain on Earth to be with his father. Storm Blaster tracked him down and gave Justin a new Turbo morpher, to help the Space Rangers. He is portrayed by Blake Foster.
 Karone  Andros' sister and the main anti-hero of the series, She was kidnapped as a child by Darkonda and handed over to Dark Specter. Karone was raised by Ecliptor, who became a father figure to her. He told that her parents were killed by the Power Rangers, she would come to be known as "Astronema", Princess of Evil. She would eventually discover the truth and defect to the Rangers' side for a time, before being captured and brainwashed to be completely loyal to Dark Specter when she went to the Dark Fortress in order to reprogram an asteroid that Dark Specter had sent on a collision course with Earth. Karone was eventually reverted to herself by Zordon's energy wave in the finale. She is portrayed by Melody Perkins.
 Trey of Triforia (Gold Zeo Ranger)  Wielder of the Golden Power Staff, who temporarily passed his powers onto Jason Scott in Zeo, while he healed after being split into three distinct personalities. Trey was later seen fighting Rita Repulsa and Lord Zedd's army.
 Blue Senturion  An intergalactic police officer from 2000; he originally was sent back in time to warn Dimitria of the United Alliance of Evil's plot, but now helps enforce the law and defeat villains. He also assisted the Turbo Rangers, before departing to Eltar with Dimitria to help Zordon. The Blue Senturion was later seen with the Phantom Ranger fighting the Machine Empire's army. He is voiced by David Walsh (uncredited).
 Phantom Ranger  A Ranger of unknown origins. He had helped the second Turbo Rangers fight Divatox. He and Cassie share a bond. The Phantom Ranger helped the rangers gain access to a new Megazord and was later seen with the Blue Senturion fighting the Machine Empire's army.
 Zordon  Founder and former mentor of the Mighty Morphin Power Rangers, Power Rangers Zeo, and original Turbo Rangers. Zordon returned to his home planet of Eltar, only to be captured; Dark Specter proceeded to continually drain Zordon of his powers while filling his container with lava, ensuring all Rangers would lose hope. With Dark Specter's destruction, Zordon regained his powers, only to sacrifice himself to unleash an energy wave that wiped out the United Alliance of Evil. He is voiced by Robert L. Manahan (uncredited).
 Adam Park  Carlos' predecessor and Zack's successor, Adam was the second Black Mighty Morphin Ranger, Green Zeo Ranger, and the first Green Turbo Ranger. When Carlos began doubting himself following a disastrous fight with Lizwizard, Adam helped him through it. Adam also held onto his morpher when Rito destroyed his team's powers. He succeeded in morphing into the Black Mighty Morphin Ranger once more, though it nearly killed him. He is portrayed by Johnny Yong Bosch.

Villains
 Dark Specter  The "Grand Monarch of Evil", who all other villains fear, Dark Specter appears as a gigantic lava-monster. He is the leader of the United Alliance of Evil. He was shown to have the ability to shape shift. Dark Specter was responsible for the fall of Eltar, he managed to capture Zordon and proceeded to slowly drain his powers throughout the season. He nearly met his end with the creation of the Psycho Rangers, who drew their energy from the evil monarch every time they fought. He was killed in the finale by Darkonda, who had stolen a Velocifighter armed with an experimental laser. With his dying breath, he devoured Darkonda before exploding. He is voiced by Christopher Grey.
 Astronema  The "Princess of Evil", Astronema is a sinister and ruthless villainess who was groomed as a child in the ways of evil. There are hints she isn't as evil as is led to believe, such as when she saves the lives of a family under attack by one of her own Quantrons. It is later discovered that she is Karone, sister of the Red Space Ranger Andros. She defected to the Rangers' side for a time, before being captured, brainwashed and given cybernetic implants which overwrote her emotions. As a result of this, her demeanor became cold, and even more ruthless and evil than before. She would later create the Psycho Rangers and link their powers directly to Dark Specter in an attempt to do away with the monarch and take power for herself. When Dark Specter is killed in the finale, she becomes the "Queen of Evil", she is seemingly killed accidentally during a confrontation with Andros, but is revived by Andros' tears. In Power Rangers Beast Morphers, Astronema's gauntlet was found in Ryjack's collection of weapons. Astronema was Robo-Roxy's choice to rejoin Evox's army. Robo-Blaze remarks that Astronema was purified much of Robo-Roxy's disgust. She is portrayed by Melody Perkins.
 Ecliptor  A wire-frame model-themed robot who is Astronema's guardian and surrogate father. He raised Astronema to be evil, caring for her like his own daughter. After Astronema learns her true identity, Ecliptor remained devoted to his princess, defending her against the attacks of his own forces. Branded a traitor, he is given additional cybernetics that suppress his better nature and make him purely evil. Upon seeing Astronema seemingly slain by her brother, Ecliptor broke free of his programming to get revenge. Despite his fatherly affection for Astronema, and his high regard for loyalty and honor, Ecliptor was killed by Zordon's energy wave. He is voiced by Walter Lang.
 Elgar  Divatox's idiotic, illiterate nephew. He was reassigned to the Dark Fortress by Dark Specter, mostly to allow Divatox to move Zordon around the universe without his bumbling threatening to ruin things. He is killed by Zordon's energy wave. He is portrayed by Kenny Graceson and voiced by David Umansky.
 Darkonda  A bandaged bounty hunter who was responsible for kidnapping Karone as a child. Sadistic and treacherous, Darkonda was the arch rival to Ecliptor. He was given 9 lives, but managed to lose all but one though bungling or being defeated. He planned to kill Dark Specter with the missile intended for Earth's destruction, but was swallowed by the evil monarch before he perished. He is voiced by Steve Kramer.
 Darkliptor  An entity which is created when Darkonda forcibly absorbs Ecliptor into himself, thereby adding all of Ecliptor's powers and some of Ecliptor's physical being to Darkonda's own. When Darkliptor exists, Darkonda's personality is dominant, and with Ecliptor's powers on top of Darkonda's, Darkliptor is near invincible. Ecliptor constantly tries to free himself from Darkliptor, and always succeeds eventually, to Darkonda's annoyance. He is voiced by Steve Kramer.
 Quantrons  Astronema's foot soldiers. Appearing as silver robots with blades as their primary weapons. Like the Cogs before them, they pilot vehicles for attacks.  The Quantrons are the fourth group of foot soldiers created for Power Rangers and don't have a Sentai counterpart.
 Craterites  Foot soldiers from the Astro Megaship simudeck's training program. A lightning bolt once hit the Megaship while T.J. And Ashley were doing a session, causing them to become real and hide among the people in Angel Grove by disguising themselves as humans. After fighting the Rangers, they then merged into a Conglomerate version of themselves. After being defeated by the Astro Megazord, they were once again part of the simudeck program.  The Megaranger counterparts of the Craterites are called Soldiers Kunekune.
 Piranhatrons  Divatox's foot soldiers from Power Rangers Turbo. Some of them were placed under Astronema's control.
 Psycho Rangers The Psycho Rangers are five evil Rangers created by Astronema as part of her plans to destroy both the Power Rangers and Dark Specter.
 Psycho Red Psycho Red was the leader of the Psycho Rangers. His monster form was a fire-like monster. He is portrayed and voiced by Patrick David.
 Psycho Black His monster form is a rock golem who can use a rock-like tentacle. He is portrayed and voiced by Michael Maize.
 Psycho Blue His monster form is a crystalline ice monster with freezing powers. He is voiced by Wally Wingert.
 Psycho Yellow In her monster form, Psycho Yellow is a spider/hornet-like monster. She is portrayed and voiced by Kamera Walton.
 Psycho Pink In her monster form, Psycho Pink is a plant-like monster. She is voiced by Vicki Davis.

Monsters
The monsters used in this season work for Astronema. The monsters are adapted from the monsters that are featured in Denji Sentai Megaranger. Some of the monsters have twisted parts while others appear to be robotic. To make a monster grow, Astronema would give orders to fire the Sattelaser at the monster making it grow.

 Manta Menace - A stingray monster occasionally fought on the Simudeck.
 Electrotramp (voiced by Blake Torney) - An electrical monster that Astronema used to draw out the Rangers to have her hypnotized Teenage Mutant Ninja Turtles "help" them defeat him. In battle, he summons large spheres of electricity which he then throws at his opponents. It was destroyed by the Ninja Turtles when Venus de Milo sends his electrical attack back at him.
 Clawhammer (voiced by Kim Strauss) - A shrimp monster from the planet Kalderon who can project an energy blade from his claw. It was destroyed by the Astro Megazord.
 Voltage Hog (voiced by Kirk Tornton) - An electrical pig monster that can drain electricity from power lines and use it in its tentacles to fight its enemies. It was destroyed by the Astro Megazord.
 Elephantitan (voiced by Michael Sorich) - A titanic elephant monster used by Astronema. It was destroyed by the Astro Megazord.
 Waspicable (voiced by Ken Merckx) - Waspicable is a kind-hearted wasp monster. He was able to project powerful energy blasts from his eyes and teleport in a little ball beam. After helping to defeat Sting King, he planned to do good where he started by retrieving a girl's balloons that drifted into the air.
 Sting King (voiced by Bob Papenbrook) - A robotic bee monster partnered with Waspicable. He could fire a rapid series of lasers from his stinger arm or release a swarm of bees. When in space, his blasts can affect an entire city. It was destroyed by the Astro Megazord.
 Crocovile (voiced by Tony Oliver) - A regenerating crocodile monster used by Astronema to distract the Rangers while Dark Specter whisks Zordon far away. It was capable of duplicating himself: one with a crocodile head for a left hand and another with a crocodile tail for a right arm. It was destroyed by the Astro and Delta Megazords.
 Destructipede (voiced by Mike Reynolds) - An illusion-casting centipede monster used by Astronema. It was destroyed by the Astro Delta Megazord.
 Power Driller (voiced by Kirk Thornton) - A rhinoceros-like drill monster summoned by Destructipede. When he walked, he created earthquakes. It was destroyed when Destructipede was destroyed.
 Fearog (voiced by Ezra Weisz) - A toad monster summoned by Destructipede. It was destroyed when Destructipede was destroyed.
 Behemoth (voiced by Richard Cansino) - A moth monster summoned by Destructipede. It was destroyed when Destructipede was destroyed.
 Mamamite (voiced by Jackie Marchand) - A termite monster with a drill-tipped abdomen for a left hand. Mamamite burrowed underground and laid some eggs before being destroyed by the Spiral Saber's Booster Mode and the Quadrablaster.
 Termitus (voiced by Dave Mallow) - A soldier termite-themed monster with a termite head shape for a left hand that was formed when the cloud of Mamamite's hatched termites combined. It could eat through the Rangers' weapons and has the ability to separate itself into a cloud of termites in order to evade the Rangers attacks. It was destroyed by the Astro Delta Megazord.
 Barillian Bug (voiced by Kim Strauss) - Insect monsters that once attacked KO-35 turning whoever it stung into the scorpion-like Barillian Bug monsters. It was destroyed by the Astro Megazord.
 Mutantrus (voiced by Brett Walkow) - A giant squid-like monster grown from a portion of the giant mutated Darkonda. He could fly through space and blast lasers from his forehead. It was destroyed by Mega V1 and V3.
 Lionizer (voiced by Ken Merckx) - A robotic lion monster used by Astronema. It was destroyed by the Mega Voyager.
 Body Switcher (voiced by Ezra Weisz) - A robotic body-switching bat/Grim Reaper monster used by Astronema. On a related note during Body Switcher's demonstration of his abilities, five of the monsters Body Switcher turned into were Beetleborgs monsters Cataclaws, LottaMuggs, Unctuous, Firecat, and a monster with the head and body of Rocket Man, the recolored hands of Green Cannon Machine, and generic boots. It was destroyed by the Mega Voyager.
 Lunatick (voiced by Bob Papenbrook) - An antlion monster from the planet Kadix that had battled the six Space Rangers. It spoke a strange alien language. It was destroyed by the Astro Delta Megazord.
 Crocotoxes (voiced by Michael Sorich) - A duo of toxic eel monsters (one red, one blue) created by Darkonda on Deketa 5. The toxin gave people black spots when they were in the water. One was destroyed by the Astro Delta Megazord and the other was destroyed by the Silver Ranger.
 Praying Mantis (voiced by Dave Mallow) - A robotic mantis monster used by Astronema. It was destroyed by the Mega Voyager.
 Destructoid (voiced by Ezra Weisz) - An unspecified wild beast monster that turned on Astronema when she started berating it for failure. Zhane saved her by driving it off.
 Horror Bulls (voiced by Brad Orchard) - A set of water buffalo monsters used by Ecliptor. The first was destroyed by the Spiral Saber's Booster Mode and Quadrablaster. The second was destroyed by the Astro Delta Megazord.
 Coralizer (voiced by Tadahiro Nakamura) - A coral monster used by Darkonda. He infected the KO-35 Rebels with corals to grow on them on the planet Centaur B. It was destroyed by the Astro Delta Megazord.
 Lizwizard (voiced by Ezra Weisz) - An electrical chameleon monster used by Astronema. His long tongue enables him to switch places with whoever is wrapped up in them. It was destroyed by the Astro Megazord.
 Batarax (voiced by Richard Cansino) - A sonic-emitting bat monster used by Astronema. It was destroyed by the Astro Megazord.
 Spikey (voiced by Bob Papenbrook) - A robotic cactus-based monster with sharp claws on one of his hands who was created by Astronema. It was destroyed by the Mega Voyager.
 Frightwing (voiced by Tony Oliver) - A robotic condor monster used by Astronema. It was destroyed by the Winged Mega Voyager.
 Owl Monster (voiced by Brad Orchard) - A robotic owl monster. He could fire light blasts and lasers from his eyes in battle. It was destroyed by the Astro Megazord.
 Datascammer (voiced by Richard Steven Horvitz) - A robotic data-gathering lizard monster with a satellite-like frill who was used by Astronema. He could emit blasts from his mouth and scanned information from the Power Rangers for Astronema. It was destroyed by the Winged Mega Voyager.
 Jakarak (voiced by Lex Lang) - An anglerfish monster from the planet Tirna who was the former master of Seymour. He had a flower on his head that was capable of turning anything into stone. It was destroyed by the Astro Delta Megazord.
 Vacsacker (voiced by Richard Epcar) - A robotic monster that was used to abduct people to Secret City. It was destroyed by the Mega Voyager.
 Tankenstein (voiced by Derek Stephen Prince) - A powerful shape-shifting mechanical entity used by Astronema. He could regenerate himself as well as electrocute anything with hidden cables. It self-destructed in order to destroy the Mega Voyager.

United Alliance of Evil
Villains from previous series also appeared as members of the United Alliance of Evil where they were gathered by Dark Specter.

 Lord Zedd - He is portrayed by Ed Neil and voiced by Robert Axelrod.
 Rita Repulsa - She is portrayed by Carla Perez and voiced by Barbara Goodson.
 Goldar - He is voiced by Kerrigan Mahan.
 Finster - Finster was seen at Dark Specter's party on the Cimmerian Planet and during the attack on the Vica Galaxy. He is voiced by Robert Axelrod.
 Master Vile - Rita Repulsa's father. He was only seen at Dark Specter's party on the Cimmerian Planet.
 King Mondo - The king of the Machine Empire. He is voiced by David Stenstrom.
 Queen Machina - The queen of the Machine Empire. She is voiced by Brianne Siddall.
 Prince Sprocket - The son of King Mondo and Queen Machina. He is voiced by Barbara Goodson.
 Klank and Orbus - The aids of King Mondo. They are voiced by Oliver Page and Barbara Goodson.
 Divatox - The leader of the Space Pirates and Elgar's aunt who becomes a rival of Astronema. She is portrayed by Hilary Shepard Turner.
 Rygog - Divatox's second-in-command. He was present at Divatox's attack on Gratha. He is voiced by Lex Lang.
 Porto - Divatox's technical advisor. He is voiced by Scott Page-Pagter.
 General Havoc - Divatox's brother. He accompanied the Machine Empire in attacking the Phantom Ranger's home world where they were opposed by the Blue Senturion and the Phantom Ranger. He is voiced by Richard Cansino.

Episodes

Home media
A VHS release for Power Rangers in Space contained the "Psycho Rangers" arc.

In 2012, Shout Factory announced that it had reached an exclusive distribution deal with Saban for shows such as Power Rangers and Big Bad Beetleborgs. Power Rangers in Space was released on DVD in August 2012, as part of a Time-Life exclusive boxed set containing seasons 1–7. The show later became available independently of the boxed set in two volumes, the first volume consisting of first 22 episodes was released on August 5, 2014 and the second volume containing the remaining 21 episodes was released on October 7, 2014.

Comics
Characters have been featured in Power Rangers comics published by Boom! Studios.

In 2018, the In Space Rangers appeared in "Shattered Grid", a crossover event between teams from all eras commemorating the 25th anniversary of the original television series. It was published in Mighty Morphin Power Rangers #25-30 and various tie-ins. A Power Rangers in Space story by Adam Cesare and Hyeonjin Kimwas was published in Mighty Morphin Power Rangers 2018 Annual as part of the crossover.

"Beyond the Grid," the follow up to "Shattered Grid", was published in Mighty Morphin Power Rangers #31-39. It saw Andros joining a new team alongside the Ranger Slayer, the Magna Defender, Cameron, Tanya and the Dark Ranger.

A story by Trey Moore and Da Jung Lee, featuring Karone and both the In Space and Lost Galaxy Rangers, was published in Mighty Morphin Power Rangers 25th Anniversary Special #1.

In 2019, Saban's Power Rangers: The Psycho Path by Paul Allor and Diego Galindo was published. An original graphic novel taking place after the events of the Power Rangers in Space television series, it features both the return and origin of the Psycho Rangers.

In 2022, Power Rangers #17-22 featured Andros, and later Zhane, in a story taking place before the events of the Power Rangers in Space television series.

Reception

Most critics gave the show a positive reception.

Notes

References

External links
 
 
 Power Rangers in Space - Bandai America

 
In Space
Television shows filmed in Los Angeles
Television shows filmed in Santa Clarita, California
Television shows set in California
1998 American television series debuts
1998 American television series endings
Fox Broadcasting Company original programming
Fox Kids
1990s American science fiction television series
American children's adventure television series
Space adventure television series
English-language television shows
Television series by Saban Entertainment
Television series about size change
1990s American high school television series
Television series set on fictional planets
Television series about outer space
American children's action television series
American children's fantasy television series
Television series created by Haim Saban